Haeromys is a genus of rodent in the family Muridae endemic to Southeast Asia.
It contains the following species:
 Ranee mouse (Haeromys margarettae)
 Minahassa ranee mouse (Haeromys minahassae)
 Lesser ranee mouse (Haeromys pusillus)

References

 
Rodent genera
Taxa named by Oldfield Thomas
Taxonomy articles created by Polbot